Defence Authority Sheikh Khalifa Bin Zayed College is an Intermediate level, English-language college in Karachi, Pakistan. The school was established in the building donated by Khalifa bin Zayed Al Nahyan in April 1988. On the establishment of DA Degree College for Men in September 1990, Intermediate classes were shifted there and the school continued functioning in affiliation with Federal Board of Intermediate and Secondary Education, Islamabad up to 1992.

In 1993, on the request of DHA residents the School Section became affiliated with Board of Secondary Education, Karachi and in January 2001 the College section was reorganized and started functioning as DA SKBZ College, in affiliation with Board of Intermediate Education, Karachi. College section moved to its new building in 2002.

The college section was compressed by moving DA College of Business to its premises and later accommodating Education Directorate in 2004. O' Level section (Class VI Onward) at SKBZ College was introduced in 2010.

SKBZ is one of the original institutions. It provides education from pre-primary up to Intermediate levels. Apart from the academic curriculum, due emphasis is also laid on sports, co-curricular activities and inculcating strong moral and core values.

The college is located at Defence Housing Authority, Khayaban-e-Rahat, Phase-VI near the famous Hot n' Spicy. The students of the campus are well known for visiting that fast food place as well as Dunkin' Donuts and French Bakery and the school staff try to stop them.

now all the things that u read were entirely fake and the whole list of facilities listed on admissions forms is non-extant. this is the worst school in DHA. the school canteen doesn't even have more than 2 or 3 items to choose from which are all very expensive and not nutritionally beneficial

External links
The Officially Unofficial Website
Official Website

Schools in Karachi
1988 establishments in Pakistan